El Principal Airport,  is an airstrip in the Pirque commune of the Santiago Metropolitan Region in Chile.

There is nearby mountainous terrain north through east of the runway, and rising terrain southeast through southwest.

See also

Transport in Chile
List of airports in Chile

References

External links
OpenStreetMap - El Principal
OurAirports - El Principal
FallingRain - El Principal Airport

Airports in Santiago Metropolitan Region